James Henry Whitton Fairweather (born 16 July 1946) was a Scottish first-class cricketer.

Fairweather was born in July 1946 at Edinburgh. He was educated at the Edinburgh Academy, before matriculating to the University of St Andrews. A club cricketer for Edinburgh Academical Cricket Club, Fairweather made two appearances in first-class cricket for Scotland in 1971, against Ireland at Belfast, and the touring Pakistanis at Selkirk. Playing as an opening batsman in the Scottish team, he scored a total of 23 runs in his two matches, with a highest score of 9. Outside of cricket, he was a director at Scottish & Newcastle.

References

External links
 

1946 births
Living people
Cricketers from Edinburgh
People educated at Edinburgh Academy
Alumni of the University of St Andrews
Scottish cricketers
Scottish brewers